Business International may refer to:

Business International (TV programme), CNN International's 2000–2009 global business news television programme
Business International Corporation, a research, publishing and advisory company that was later merged with the Economist Intelligence Unit